Elyasi-ye Saleh Matta (also Romanized as Elyāsī-ye Şāleḩ Maţţā‘) is a village in Posht Tang Rural District, in the Central District of Sarpol-e Zahab County, Kermanshah Province, Iran. At the 2006 census, its population was 129, in 23 families.

References 

Populated places in Sarpol-e Zahab County